Count Your Blessings is a 1994 Christmas album, taking its title from the song of the same name included as its first track, presenting a concert recorded by Jane Siberry, Holly Cole, Rebecca Jenkins, Mary Margaret O'Hara and Victoria Williams. The concert was broadcast on CBC Radio in Canada, and National Public Radio in the United States, in 1993.

The concert presented a program of traditional Christmas music, both well-known standards and lesser-known songs. It also included three original Christmas-themed songs written by the artists themselves: O'Hara's "Never, No", Siberry's "Are You Burning, Little Candle?" and Williams' "A Holy Thing".

Track listing
"Count Your Blessings" (3:19) - performed by Cole, Jenkins, Siberry
"Please Come Home for Christmas" (2:35) - performed by Cole
"White Christmas" (2:46) - performed by O'Hara
"Un Flambeau, Jeanette, Isabelle" (3:38) - performed by Cole, Jenkins, Siberry
"What Is This Fragrance?" (2:15) - performed by O'Hara
"Have Yourself a Merry Little Christmas" (3:12) - performed by Williams
"Carol of the Bells" (3:07) - performed by Cole, Jenkins, Siberry
"Never, No" (2:05) - performed by O'Hara
"I'll Be Home for Christmas" (3:07) - performed by Jenkins
"Are You Burning, Little Candle?" (2:43) - performed by Siberry
"Deck the Halls" (2:41) - performed by Cole
"A Holy Thing" (3:37) - performed by Williams
"In the Bleak Midwinter" (4:27) - performed by Siberry
"Silent Night" (5:25)

References

1994 Christmas albums
1994 compilation albums
Christmas compilation albums
Pop compilation albums
Christmas albums by Canadian artists
Jane Siberry albums
Mary Margaret O'Hara albums
Holly Cole albums